Saint John of Karpathos was an Eastern Orthodox monk and Bishop whose works can be found in the Philokalia.

Life 
Little is known about the life of Saint John of Karpathos. Saint Nicodemus of The Holy Mountain said "‘It is not known when he [Saint John of Karpathos] was active or where he underwent his ascetic struggles." It is thought that Saint John of Karpathos became the Bishop of Karpathos.

Some of the writings of Saint John of Karpathos can be found the Philokalia, a collection of writings from between the 4th and 15th centuries.

Sainthood 
In the mid 1980s, Metropolitan Ambrose of Karpathos and Kasos sought for Saint John of Karpathos to be included in the Official List of Orthodox Saints, with the Blessing of the Ecumenical Patriarch of Constantinople.

In 1985, August 25 was designated as the Feast Day of Saint John of Karpathos.

References 

Byzantine writers
Byzantine saints
Philokalia